= Fatherland War =

Fatherland War may refer to:

- First Fatherland War, the French invasion of Russia in 1812
- Second Fatherland War, an occasional reference to the Eastern Front (World War I) in Russian sources
- Fatherland Liberation War, the Korean War
